NXT TakeOver 31 was the 31st NXT TakeOver professional wrestling livestreaming event produced by WWE. It was held exclusively for wrestlers from the promotion's NXT brand division. Unlike all previous TakeOvers, which aired exclusively on the WWE Network, TakeOver 31 was the first TakeOver to air on traditional pay-per-view (PPV) in addition to the WWE Network. The event took place on October 4, 2020, and was broadcast from the Capitol Wrestling Center, hosted at the WWE Performance Center in Orlando, Florida—this was the first NXT event to feature the Capitol Wrestling Center, NXT's version of the WWE ThunderDome used for Raw and SmackDown and an homage to the Capitol Wrestling Corporation, the predecessor to WWE.

Five matches were contested at the event. In the main event, Finn Bálor defeated Kyle O'Reilly to retain the NXT Championship. In the penultimate match, Io Shirai defeated Candice LeRae to retain the NXT Women's Championship. Other prominent matches included Santos Escobar defeating Isaiah "Swerve" Scott to retain the NXT Cruiserweight Championship and Damian Priest defeating Johnny Gargano to retain the NXT North American Championship in the opening bout.

Production

Background
TakeOver was a series of professional wrestling shows that began in May 2014, as WWE's NXT brand held their second WWE Network-exclusive event, billed as TakeOver. In subsequent months, the "TakeOver" moniker became the brand used by WWE for all of their NXT live specials. Titled for being the 31st NXT TakeOver event, TakeOver 31 was scheduled to be held on October 4, 2020. While NXT TakeOver events were originally exclusive to the WWE Network, TakeOver 31 was the first TakeOver to also be available on traditional pay-per-view.

Impact of the COVID-19 pandemic
As a result of the COVID-19 pandemic that began affecting the industry in mid-March, WWE had to present the majority of its programming from a behind closed doors set. NXT's programming was held at NXT's home base of Full Sail University in Winter Park, Florida. In October 2020, it was announced that beginning with TakeOver 31, NXT would be moving their events to the WWE Performance Center in Orlando, Florida, which would feature the new "Capitol Wrestling Center" setup, an homage to the Capitol Wrestling Corporation, the predecessor to WWE. Like the WWE ThunderDome utilized for Raw and SmackDown's programming, LED boards were placed around the Performance Center so that fans could attend virtually, while additionally, friends and family members of the wrestlers were in attendance, along with a limited number of actual live fans, divided from each other by plexiglass walls.

Storylines

The card included matches that resulted from scripted storylines, where wrestlers portrayed heroes, villains, or less distinguishable characters in scripted events that built tension and culminated in a wrestling match or series of matches. Results were predetermined by WWE's writers on the NXT brand, while storylines were produced on their weekly television program, NXT.

On the September 23 episode of NXT, Kyle O'Reilly won a gauntlet eliminator match, defeating Bronson Reed, Cameron Grimes, Kushida, and Timothy Thatcher to face NXT Champion Finn Bálor for the title at TakeOver 31.

On the September 23 episode of NXT, Candice LeRae won a battle royal to become the number one contender for the NXT Women's Championship against Io Shirai at TakeOver 31.

On September 23, NXT general manager William Regal announced that Damian Priest would defend the NXT North American Championship against Johnny Gargano at TakeOver 31.

On the August 12 episode of NXT, Kushida and the returning Velveteen Dream competed in a triple threat match to determine who would qualify for the ladder match at TakeOver XXX. After the match, Dream attacked Kushida. At Night 2 of NXT Super Tuesday on September 8, Kushida returned and attacked Dream. On September 26, a match between the two was scheduled for TakeOver 31.

Event

Preliminary matches
The pay-per-view opened with Johnny Gargano challenging Damian Priest for Priest's NXT North American Championship. A spot in the match saw Damian Priest use a suicide dive but Johnny Gargano moved out of the way and Priest landed on a cameraman. At the conclusion of a competitive match, Priest managed to reverse Gargano's attempt at his slingshot DDT finisher (known as "One Final Beat") into his own rolling cutter finisher (known as "The Reckoning") which secured him the victory.

Next, Kushida faced the Velveteen Dream. Kushida was the aggressor for the majority of the match, with Dream only getting brief flurries of offense in. At the match's climax, Kushida locked in his "Hoverboard Lock" submission finisher and Dream tried to escape from it. He managed to hoist Kushida on his shoulders to deliver his own "Dream Valley Driver" maneuver, but still, Kushida did not release the hold, and Dream eventually submitted. Kushida continued to attack Dream after the bell, having to be pulled away by officials.

Isaiah "Swerve" Scott then challenged Santos Escobar for his NXT Cruiserweight Championship. This marked the first occasion that the cruiserweight championship was defended during the main card of a TakeOver event. The match was competitive, and both men kicked out of their opponent's finisher (the first instance in which Escobar's "Phantom Driver" did not secure him a victory). At the match's conclusion, Escobar's Legado del Fantasma stablemates Joaquin Wilde and Raul Mendoza ran in to distract Scott, but were chased off by Ashante "Thee" Adonis, entering to help Swerve. In the confusion, Escobar hit Swerve with a lifting, kneeling double-underhook facebreaker (which later came to be known as "Legado") and earned the pinfall.

The penultimate match of the night was for the NXT Women's Championship, Io Shirai defending against Candice LeRae. The two traded high-impact and high-flying maneuvers for many minutes, until LeRae locked in her husband's signature "Garga-No Escape" submission hold. When Shirai reached the ropes to force the break, LeRae inadvertently elbowed the official. Gargano then ran in with a referee's shirt on to try to fast-count the win for his wife, unsuccessfully. He then grabbed the championship belt and gave it to LeRae to use as a weapon, which she did, but Shirai still survived. Following a top-rope Spanish Fly and her signature finishing moonsault, Shirai won the match to retain the championship. Afterward, the mystery biker who had been advertised to make their appearance at TakeOver 31 came out to confront Shirai and was revealed to be Ember Moon. Toni Storm also confronted Shirai via satellite and confirmed that she has returned to NXT.

Main event
Kyle O'Reilly challenged Finn Bálor for the NXT Championship. The match was physically intense, with the two men trading stiff shots at one another for the bulk of it. Late on a kick by Bálor to the face of O'Reilly knocked him off his feet and he sustained legitimate injury. A knee to the gut of Bálor injured him and he started bleeding from the mouth. O'Reilly also sustained a notable shot to his liver, which was referenced in-storyline in the following days. The end featured Bálor using his "Coup de Grâce" finisher (a top rope diving double foot-stomp) on O'Reilly to retain. He offered a handshake to O'Reilly as a sign of respect after the brutal match.

After the match, as the show was about to go off the air, Ridge Holland suddenly appeared behind the barricade. He held over one shoulder a badly-beaten Adam Cole (O'Reilly's Undisputed Era stablemate). Holland said nothing, dropped Cole at ringside, and left. The show closed with O'Reilly, Roderick Strong, and Bobby Fish checking on Cole.

Both Bálor and O'Reilly sustained legitimate injuries in the match with Bálor suffering a hairline jaw fracture while O'Reilly had broken teeth and other unspecified injuries. Both missed the subsequent episode of NXT as a result.

Reception
NXT TakeOver 31 received positive reviews from fans and insiders, with the NXT Championship Match garnering the most praise.

Kevin Pantoja of 411Mania gave the show a score of 9 out of 10 stating: "The COVID era TakeOvers have been good but not great. Well, this one gets back to classic TakeOver levels. The worst thing was a good KUSHIDA/Dream match. Then, you get a heck of an opener and two **** title matches before an all-time banger of a main event. To top it off, the show runs under two and a half hours, which is great."

Adam Silverstein of CBS Sports called TakeOver 31 one of the best shows of the year. He gave the NXT North American Championship match a grade of A−, Kushida vs. Velveteen Dream a grade of B, the Cruiserweight Championship match a grade of A−, the Women's Championship match a grade of B+ and the NXT Championship match a grade of A.

Dave Meltzer of the Wrestling Observer Newsletter gave 3.75 stars to the NXT North American, Cruiserweight and Women's Championship matches while giving 3.25 stars to Kushida vs. Velveteen Dream and 4.5 stars to the NXT Championship match.

Aftermath
Ridge Holland was seriously injured on the October 7 episode of NXT, putting him out of action for an extended period.

As announced during TakeOver, NXT was set to revive Halloween Havoc as a special episode of NXT on October 28, hosted by Shotzi Blackheart. On the October 14 episode of the program, Candice LeRae defeated Blackheart to earn another opportunity to challenge Io Shirai for the NXT Women's Championship. Johnny Gargano was also given a return bout with Damian Priest for the NXT North American Championship, and both title matches were announced to be "Spin the Wheel, Make the Deal" matches (a reference to the 1992 Halloween Havoc and just such a match between Jake "The Snake" Roberts and Sting).

Kyle O'Reilly returned to NXT on the October 14 episode, cutting a promo before stablemates Roderick Strong and Bobby Fish won a match to become number one contenders to the NXT Tag Team Championship, saying he would be medically cleared to wrestle again the following week and that if Ridge Holland were not already laid up in hospital, The Undisputed Era would have put him there.

Finn Bálor's injuries were more severe than first thought, and he underwent surgery on October 9 to repair his jaw fracture, with expected recovery time of six weeks. He returned to NXT on November 18 to announce his return, being interrupted by Pat McAfee and his "Kings of NXT" faction (of which Holland was meant to be a member prior to his injury), who then brawled with the also-returning Undisputed Era in advance of a WarGames match between the two sides at the next TakeOver event.

Results

Notes

References

External links
 

2020 WWE Network events
October 2020 events in the United States
NXT TakeOver
2020 in professional wrestling in Florida
Events in Orlando, Florida
Professional wrestling in Orlando, Florida
Impact of the COVID-19 pandemic on television